Cornelius Kierstede (December 25, 1674 - 1757) was a noted early American silversmith, active in New York City and New Haven, Connecticut.

Kierstede was the third generation of his family in New York, and christened in the Reformed Dutch Church on January 5, 1675. He was made a freeman of New York City on July 26, 1698, and worked there as a silversmith until 1704. From 1704-1706, he worked in Albany, New York, then again worked in New York City from 1707-1722. According to New Haven, Connecticut, town records of Sept. 19, 1721, he and Peter and James Ferris leased "copper and other mines except iron mines on the Bleu hils in said New Haven. . . for fifty years". This venture did not succeed. Apparently he moved to New Haven circa 1724, where he lived on the west side of Church Street. A deed dated Apr. 24, 1727, in the New Haven Land Records describes him as a "goldsmith of New York." In 1753 the New Haven Selectmen placed him in charge of a conservator "by reason of his advanced age & infirmities." He may have died in August 1757 in Bergen, New Jersey.

Kierstede's work is collected in the Metropolitan Museum of Art, Winterthur Museum, the Milwaukee Art Museum, and Yale University Art Gallery.

Gallery

References 
 "Cornelius Kierstede, colonial silversmith", by Katherine A. Wahlberg, in The Magazine Antiques, New York, N.Y.: 1971, 173(1):202-211.
 Cornelius Kierstede: Seventeenth and Eighteenth-Century Silversmiths of New York and Connecticut, Katherine Wahlberg, Master's thesis, Bard Graduate Center, 2004.
 "$5.9M punch bowl sold at Sotheby's sets new record for American silver", Antiques, January 22, 2010.
 "Cornelius Kierstede", American Silversmiths.
 Early American Silver in The Metropolitan Museum of Art by Wees, Beth Carver, Harvey, Medill Higgins, pp. 70-71.
 American Silver in the Art Institute of Chicago, Art Institute of Chicago, Yale University Press, 2016, pages 48-49.
 American Silversmiths and Their Marks: The Definitive (1948) Edition, Stephen Guernsey Cook Ensko, Courier Corporation, 1983, pages 51, 92. 
 Early Connecticut Silver, 1700–1840, Peter Bohan, Peter J. Bohan, Philip Hammerslough, Erin Eisenbarth, Wesleyan University Press, 2007, page xvi.
 American furniture with related decorative arts, 1660-1830, Layton Art Collection, Brock Jobe, Gerald W. R. Ward, Milwaukee Art Museum, Hudson Hills Press, 1991, page 98.

American silversmiths
1674 births
1757 deaths